Bellevue, also known as the "Longfellow House", is a historic home in Pascagoula, Mississippi facing the Gulf of Mexico and is listed on the National Register of Historic Places.

It was built in 1850 as a home for slave trader Daniel Smith Graham.  Since then, the building has served a number of functions including a girls' school, a private residence, as well as, a private resort and club owned by Ingalls Shipbuilding.  Legend has it that Henry Wadsworth Longfellow once stayed here when he wrote his work The Building of the Ship but little evidence has emerged to support this.

Later, the property was purchased by Richard Scruggs and his wife, Dianne, who restored the structure and donated it to the University of Mississippi Foundation.  After being damaged by Hurricane Katrina, it was sold in 2006 to Drs. Randy and Tracy Roth for use as a private residence.

References

Houses completed in 1850
Houses on the National Register of Historic Places in Mississippi
Pascagoula, Mississippi
Houses in Jackson County, Mississippi
National Register of Historic Places in Jackson County, Mississippi